Catharina Bråkenhielm (born 1956) is a Swedish social democratic politician who has been a member of the Riksdag from 2002 to 2018.

External links
Catharina Bråkenhielm at the Riksdag website

1956 births
Living people
Members of the Riksdag from the Social Democrats
Women members of the Riksdag
Articles containing video clips
Date of birth missing (living people)
Members of the Riksdag 2002–2006
21st-century Swedish women politicians